Stanisław Szlendak (21 May 1920 – 24 January 1998), was a Polish ice hockey player. He played for Podhale Nowy Targ, KTH Krynica, and KS Jaworzyna during his career. He also played for the Polish national team at the 1952 Winter Olympics. With Krynica he won the 1950 Polish league championship.

References

External links
 

1920 births
1998 deaths
Ice hockey players at the 1952 Winter Olympics
KTH Krynica players
Olympic ice hockey players of Poland
People from Krynica-Zdrój
Sportspeople from Lesser Poland Voivodeship
Podhale Nowy Targ players
Polish ice hockey goaltenders